Treasure Island is a 1972 adventure film, based on the 1883 novel by Robert Louis Stevenson. The film stars Orson Welles as Long John Silver (albeit later dubbed by a different actor), Kim Burfield as Jim Hawkins, Walter Slezak as Squire Trelawney, Rik Battaglia as Captain Smollett, and Ángel del Pozo as Doctor Livesey.

This adaptation of Treasure Island was released in several different language versions, with different directors credited.

Plot
Jim Hawkins (Kim Burfield) is a young boy who works at a pub with his mother (Maria Rohm). When a drunken old sailor named Billy Bones (Lionel Stander) comes in for a drink and dies, Jim gets his hands on a map which shows the whereabouts of pirate Captain Flint's treasure. Immediately taking action, he then enlists the help of Squire Trelawney (Walter Slezak) and Dr. Livesey (Angel DelPozo) to join him as he locates the island on the map. Together, they join a ship commanded by Captain Smollett (Rik Battaglia) that will lead them to their destination.

Word of the treasure map gets around and most of the crew are recruited with the help of the ship's cook, Long John Silver (Orson Welles), an ex-pirate who had sailed with Captain Flint and intends to get the treasure by mutiny and murder.

Already on the island is a marooned pirate, Ben Gunn, who has spent his time on the island gathering the treasure.  With his help Jim, the Squire, the Doctor, the Captain and a number of loyal crewmen outwit the pirates, killing most of them in gun battles.

Silver is captured, but escapes when the ship reaches harbour in the West Indies.  Much of the plot and the linking narrative – spoken by Jim Hawkins – is faithful to the original book.

Cast
Orson Welles as Long John Silver
Kim Burfield as Jim Hawkins
Lionel Stander as Billy Bones
Walter Slezak as Squire Trelawney
Ángel del Pozo as Doctor Livesey
Rik Battaglia as Captain Smollett
Jean Lefebvre as Ben Gunn
Maria Rohm as Mrs. Hawkins
Paul Muller as Blind Pew
Michel Garland as George Merry
Aldo Sambrell as Israel Hands

Proposed 1960s version

Development
The film had its origins in Orson Welles's attempts to film his Shakespearean adaptation Chimes at Midnight in the early 1960s – a project he had worked on since the late 1930s.

After Welles had failed to convince numerous producers to finance his film, he tried an alternative approach: he wrote a screenplay for the more commercially appealing Treasure Island, and promised to make both films, back to back, filmed on the same sets and with the same cast, for barely more than the cost of one film. As well as having written the script, he proposed to direct Treasure Island and play Long John Silver.

According to Welles' assistant Juan Cobos, Welles was "afraid that Chimes wouldn't be a very appealing film at the box office and he proposed  a remake of  Treasure Island to the (producers).  It was a way  to cover the money deficit of  Chimes with a more popular film based on (Robert Louis) Stevenson´s classical novel."

Welles was a long-time admirer of the novel, and had performed it for radio in 1938. ""He loved the story, always did," said Beatrice Welles. "It's one of the books he read to me as a child."

This approach worked; Spanish producer Emiliano Piedra agreed to finance both films.

Cast and crew
The idea was to use sets and cast for both films, such as the inn.

The proposed cast for Treasure Island was as follows:
Keith Baxter as Doctor Livesey
John Gielgud as Squire Trelawney
Frasher McIntosh as Jim Hawkins
Orson Welles as Long John Silver

In order to get a local subsidy, the film needed a Spanish director and Spanish technicians. Welles suggested Jess Franco.

He would direct from a script by Welles. "We had a good script," said Welles. "It was loyal to Stevenson; my contribution was to keep it clear about just where the people were on the island, which Stevenson didn't always bother about... You don't notice it when you are reading, just when you are making a film script."

Shooting
Filming took place for a week on the Mediterranean coast of Alicante in 1964. It used a rented ship originally built for the Spanish-shot John Paul Jones (1959) and subsequently used in a number of other films.

Several scenes were allegedly shot, some of which Welles reportedly directed. Franco went on to help Welles for three weeks on shooting Chimes at Midnight. The two men had a disagreement after funding from Piedra ran out. Franco got Harry Saltzman to finance the completion of Chimes. Welles was unhappy with the arrangements and Franco left the project.

Attempts to revive the project
In March 1966 while filming Casino Royale in England, Welles said he planned to make the film the following month in Spain.

He said the film would be in colour, the budget would be $1.5 million and that part of the finance had been secured from Seven Arts Productions, who would distribute in the US and Canada. Fergus McIntosh would play Jim Hawkins and Hugh Griffith would play an unspecified role. By December however it was clear the film was not going to be made.

1972 version
In October 1971 producer Oliver Unger was going to remake Treasure Island from a script by Wolf Mankowitz starring Mark Lester.

Welles remained contractually tied to the project as both actor and writer. Eight years later, he was brought in to make the film again by producer Harry Alan Towers who had worked with Welles in radio. Welles still wanted to direct but Towers said he could not get a completion guarantee if that was the case so John Hough was brought in to do the job.

Welles starred as Long John Silver and it was shot in Spain with a Spanish crew.

Kim Burnfield, who played Jim Hawkins, came from England.

Welles said "A lot of people wanted me to do Treasure Island in Greece. But the colonels have locked up a lot of my friends so naturally I never considered going there. Besides, Spain is my home and this is the place I would rather work."

National General agreed to provide some finance and distribute in the US.

Towers sourced a boat to play the Hispaniola in the Thames. It was a floating restaurant. He arranged for it to be shipped to Spain but it sank. John Hough managed to find another boat two weeks before filming.

Filming took place in June 1972 in Almeria.

According to one contemporary report the director at one stage was Italian Andrea Bianchi who said, "I knew all about the 'black legend' of Orson Welles. When he is in front of the camera, no matter who is in the director's chair, it is Welles who directs." After a tense initial two day period, Welles and Bianchi established a working relationship.

Towers says the director was Hough and that he and Welles did not get along.

Welles was sufficiently dismissive of the rewrites to his original script that he asked not to be credited, taking the pseudonym "O.W. Jeeves".

Welles claimed his performance was dubbed by another actor without his permission. Welles did record a dubbing session, but it was over one long night in Paris, and it was felt that Welles' dubbing could not be understood. Because this was only a few weeks before the US release, that version used Welles' voice. However Towers says Nat Cohen who was in charge of the film's release in Britain and on American TV, insisted the voice be dubbed again. They hired Robert Rietty to do the job.

Reception
The Los Angeles Times said it was "not as dashing and lively as one might have wished."

References

External links 
 
Treasure Island at TCMDB
Treasure Island at Letterbox DVD
 

1972 films
1970s adventure films
1970s historical films
British historical adventure films
French swashbuckler films
Films shot in Almería
1970s English-language films
English-language French films
English-language German films
English-language Italian films
English-language Spanish films
Films directed by John Hough
Films directed by Andrea Bianchi 
Italian swashbuckler films
Films with screenplays by Orson Welles
Spanish swashbuckler films
British swashbuckler films
Treasure Island films
West German films
Films with screenplays by Wolf Mankowitz
1970s British films
1970s Italian films
1970s French films